Ebenezer Chapel may refer to:

United Kingdom

England
 Ebenezer Particular Baptist Chapel, Hastings, East Sussex
 Ebenezer Chapel, Heathfield, East Sussex
 Ebenezer Chapel, Melksham, Wiltshire
 Ebenezer Strict Baptist Chapel, Richmond, London

Wales
 Ebenezer Chapel, Aberavon, Neath Port Talbot
 Ebeneser Chapel, Ammanford, Carmarthenshire
 Ebenezer Baptist Chapel, Llandovery, Carmarthenshire
 Ebenezer Chapel, Llanelli, Carmarthenshire
 Ebenezer Chapel, Trecynon, Rhondda Cynon Taf

United States
 Ebenezer Chapel (Marmet, West Virginia)

See also
 Ebenezer (disambiguation)
 Ebenezer Church (disambiguation)